This Woman Is Mine is a 1941 American adventure film directed by Frank Lloyd and starring Franchot Tone, John Carroll and Walter Brennan. Richard Hageman was nominated at the 14th Academy Awards for Best Music, Scoring of a Dramatic Picture.

Premise
Three seafaring fur traders fall in love with an attractive stowaway discovered aboard their ship.

Cast
 Franchot Tone as Robert Stevens
 John Carroll as Ovide de Montigny  
 Walter Brennan as Captain Jonathan Thorne 
 Carol Bruce as Julie Morgan  
 Nigel Bruce as Duncan MacDougall 
 Paul Hurst as Second Mate Mumford 
 Frank Conroy as First Mate Fox 
 Leo G. Carroll as Angus 'Sandy' McKay 
 Abner Biberman as Lamazie  
 Sig Ruman as John Jacob Astor 
 Morris Ankrum as Roussel  
 Louis Mercier as Marcel La Fantasie 
 Philip Charbert as Franchere, Seaman
 Ignacio Saenz as Matouna, Indian Boy 
 Ray Beltram as Chief Nakoomis

References

External links 
 

 

1940s adventure drama films
1941 films
American black-and-white films
1940s English-language films
Films directed by Frank Lloyd
Universal Pictures films
Films based on American novels
Seafaring films
Films set in the 19th century
1940s historical adventure films
American historical adventure films
American adventure drama films
1941 drama films
1940s American films